Ivan Gotti (born 28 March 1969) is an Italian former professional road racing cyclist.

Gotti was born at San Pellegrino Terme, Lombardy. He first came to prominence by finishing 5th overall in the 1995 Tour de France. The highlights of his career are his two overall wins in the 1997 and 1999 Giro d'Italia.

Career achievements

Major results

1989
 1st Overall Giro della Valle d'Aosta
1st Stages 1 & 4
 1st 
 1st 
1990
 1st Overall Giro della Valle d'Aosta
1st Stages 2 & 3
 1st 
 1st 
 2nd Overall Giro Ciclistico d'Italia
1st Stage 8
 2nd GP Capodarco
 3rd 
1991
 2nd Giro dell'Emilia
 2nd Coppa Placci
 3rd Gran Premio Città di Camaiore
1992
 3rd Subida a Urkiola
 3rd Trofeo dello Scalatore
1993
 5th Giro dell'Emilia
 6th Coppa Sabatini
 6th Coppa Placci
 9th GP Industria & Artigianato di Larciano
1994
 10th Overall Tour de Romandie
 10th Milano–Vignola
1995
 2nd Memorial Gastone Nencini
 3rd Coppa Sabatini
 3rd GP d'Europe
 5th Overall Tour de France
1st Stage 3 (TTT)
Held  for 1 day
 5th Overall Giro del Trentino
 6th Overall Tour de Suisse
 9th Gran Premio Città di Camaiore
 9th Coppa Bernocchi
1996
 5th Overall Giro d'Italia
1st Stage 21
1997
 1st  Overall Giro d'Italia
1st Stage 14
 4th Overall Giro del Trentino
 10th Breitling Grand Prix
1998
 2nd Rominger Classic
 8th Overall Tour de Romandie
1999
 1st  Overall Giro d'Italia
 1st GP Nobili Rubinetterie
 6th Overall Giro del Trentino
2000
 5th Tre Valli Varesine
 8th Coppa Agostoni
 10th Giro dell'Emilia
2001
 1st Stage 6 Volta a Catalunya
 7th Overall Giro d'Italia
2002
 8th Overall Giro della Liguria

Grand Tour general classification results timeline

References

External links

1969 births
Cyclists from the Province of Bergamo
Living people
Italian male cyclists
Giro d'Italia winners
Italian Giro d'Italia stage winners